The 1998 congressional elections in New Hampshire were held on November 3, 1998 to determine who will represent the state of New Hampshire in the United States House of Representatives.  It coincided with the state's senatorial elections. Representatives are elected for two-year terms; those elected served in the 106th Congress from January 1999 until January 2001.  New Hampshire has two seats in the House, apportioned according to the 1990 United States Census.

Overview

References

1998
New Hampshire
1998 New Hampshire elections